Alpha-actinin-2 is a protein which in humans is encoded by the ACTN2 gene. This gene encodes an alpha-actinin isoform that is expressed in both skeletal and cardiac muscles and functions to anchor myofibrillar actin thin filaments and titin to Z-discs.

Structure
Alpha-actinin-2 is a 103.8 kDa protein composed of 894 amino acids. Each molecule is rod-shaped (35 nm in length) and it homodimerizes in an anti-parallel fashion. Each  monomer has an N-terminal actin-binding region composed of two calponin homology domains, two C-terminal EF hand domains, and four tandem spectrin-like  repeats form the rod domain in the central region of the molecule. The high-resolution crystal structure of human alpha-actinin 2 at 3.5 Å was recently resolved. Alpha actinins belong to the spectrin gene superfamily which represents a diverse group of actin-binding cytoskeletal proteins, including spectrin, dystrophin, utrophin and fimbrin. Skeletal, cardiac, and smooth muscle isoforms are localized to the Z-disc and analogous dense bodies, where they help anchor the myofibrillar actin filaments. Alpha-actinin 2 has been shown to interact with KCNA5, DLG1, DISC1, MYOZ1, GRIN2B, ADAM12,  ACTN3, MYPN, PDLIM3, PKN, MYOT, TTN, NMDAR, SYNPO2, LDB3, and FATZ.

Function 
The primary function of alpha-actinin-2 is to crosslink  filamentous actin molecules and titin molecules from adjoining sarcomeres at Z-discs, a function that is modulated by phospholipids. It is clear from studies by Hampton et al. that this crosslinking can assume a variety of conformations, with preferences for 60° and 120° angles. Alpha-actinin-2 also functions in docking signalling molecules at Z-discs, and additional studies have also implicated alpha-actinin-2 in the binding of cardiac ion channels, Kv1.5 in particular.

Clinical significance 
Mutations in ACTN2 are associated with hypertrophic cardiomyopathy, as well as dilated cardiomyopathy and endocardial fibroelastosis. The diverse functions of alpha-actinin-2 are reflected in the diverse clinical presentation of patients carrying ACTN2 mutations.

References

Further reading

External links 
 Mass spectrometry characterization of human ACTN2 at COPaKB
  GeneReviews/NIH/NCBI/UW entry on Familial Hypertrophic Cardiomyopathy Overview
 

EF-hand-containing proteins